Wenzel is a male given name (long version Wenzeslaus) as the German and Old English form of the Czech given name Václav or Venceslav, meaning "praised with glory". Variations are Вячеслав (Ukrainian and Russian), Vencel (Hungarian), Wacław, Więcław, Wiesław (Polish), Venceslas/Wenceslas (French), Venceslao (Italian), Venceslau (Portuguese), Wenceslao (Spanish).

Given name
 Wenzel Jamnitzer (ca. 1507–1585), Austrian-German etcher and goldsmith
 Wenzel, Archduke of Austria (1561–1578), Austrian prince and Grand Prior of the Order of Malta
 Wenzel Anton Graf Kaunitz (1711–1794), Austrian statesman
 Wenzel Raimund Birck (1718–1763), Austrian composer
 Wenzel Parler (1333–1399), German-Bohemian architect 
 Wenzel Pichl (1741–1805), Czech composer
 Wenzel Thomas Matiegka (1773–1830), Bohemian composer
 Prince Klemens Wenzel von Metternich (1773–1859), German-Austrian politician and statesman
 Wolfgang Wenzel von Haffner (1806–1892), Norwegian Minister of the Navy
 Wenzel Storch (born 1961), German film director and producer 
 Josef Wenzel, Prince of Liechtenstein (1696–1772), prince of Liechtenstein
 Prince Joseph Wenzel of Liechtenstein (born 1995), oldest child of Prince Alois of Liechtenstein and his wife Princess Sophie of Bavaria, Duchess in Bavaria
 Franz Wenzel, Graf von Kaunitz-Rietberg, (1742-1825), Austrian general, son of Wenzel Anton Graf Kaunitz

Surname
 Andreas Wenzel (born 1958), former Alpine skier from Liechtenstein
 Brian Wenzel (born 1929), Australian character actor
 Carl Friedrich Wenzel (ca. 1740-1793), German chemist and metallurgist
 David Wenzel (born 1950), American illustrator and children's book artist
 Eberhard Wenzel (1950–2001), German-born public health researcher
 Hanni Wenzel (born 1956), German-born alpine skier from Liechtenstein
 Hans-Georg Wenzel (1949–1999), geodesist, geophysicist and university lecturer
 Joan Wenzel (born 1953), Canadian middle-distance runner
 Johann Wenzel (1902–1969), GRU spy in WWII Germany, radio specialist
 Joseph W. Wenzel (1940–2021), American argumentation and rhetorical scholar
 Leopold Wenzel or Léopold de Wenzel (1847–1923), Italian conductor and composer
 Rene Wenzel, American cycling coach
 Sally Wenzel, American pulmonologist

See also 
 Wenzl (surname)
 Wentzel
 Wenzell Baird Bryant (1927-2008), American filmmaker
 Margaret Wenzell (born 1925), All-American Girls Professional Baseball League player
 Wenzel's, British bakery chain

Surnames from given names

References

Slavic-language names
German masculine given names
German-language surnames